Dimitri Terzakis (born March 12, 1938, in Athens) is a Greek composer. His father was the author Angelos Terzakis.

From 1959–1964 Terzakis studied composition with Yannis Papaioannou at the Athens Hellenic Conservatory, followed by five years spent at the Hochschule für Musik in Cologne, Germany where he studied composition with Bernd Alois Zimmermann and electronic music with Herbert Eimert. Works by Terzakis have been performed at the International Society for Contemporary Music Festival in Basle (1970), the Darmstadt Artists' Colony summer courses (1970) and the Hamburg Das Neue Werk series (1972). He taught counterpoint and fugue (1974–94) and Byzantine music and composition (1989–94) at the Musikhochschule, Düsseldorf. In 1980 he began to organize summer courses in Western and south-eastern European music in Nafplion. In 1985–6 he was guest professor of composition at the Hochschule für Musik Hanns Eisler. From 1994 to his retirement he held the chair for composition at the Leipzig Felix Mendelssohn College of Music and Theatre.

He has been a German citizen since 1985 and is living and composing in Leipzig, Germany, and Nafplion, Greece.

Compositions
As a composer, Terzakis' music began with an expanded tonality (Prelude (1961) and Legend (1964)) moving to 12-note serialism (e.g. the Sinfonietta (1965)) and then to a fruitful exploration of micro-intervals and glissandi, principally in his melody, based on Byzantine music. In recent years, Terzakis's view of Western harmony, polyphony and the tempered system as constituting only an extended episode in the evolution of music has increasingly led him to an essentially monophonic output. In this he has drawn example from Greek traditional music, as well as from other parts of the Mediterranean and the Near East.

Terzakis has written numerous symphonic works, chamber music pieces, vocal art songs, and choral pieces such as Kassandra after Aischylos for the ensemble amarcord. He has also written three operas: Circus Universal (1975), Thomas Torquemada (1976), and Hermes (1984).

Sources
George Leotsakos. The New Grove Dictionary of Opera, edited by Stanley Sadie (1992).  and

External links
 Official Web Site
 Biography and interview at the Music Library of Greece

1938 births
20th-century classical composers
21st-century classical composers
Greek classical composers
Greek opera composers
Living people
Male classical composers
Male opera composers
Musicians from Athens
20th-century male musicians
21st-century male musicians